The 1959 Texas Longhorns football team represented the University of Texas at Austin during the 1959 NCAA University Division football season. On New Year's Day 1960, Texas lost to top-ranked Syracuse in the Cotton Bowl Classic, 23–14.

Schedule

Awards and honors
 Maurice Doke, Cotton Bowl Classic co-Most Valuable Player

References

Texas
Texas Longhorns football seasons
Southwest Conference football champion seasons
Texas Longhorns football